Indian Hill is a mountain in Dukes County, Massachusetts. Whiting Hill is located southwest and Pilot Hill is located northeast of Indian Hill.

References

Mountains of Massachusetts
Mountains of Dukes County, Massachusetts